, sometimes known as , were a group of Japanese political activists of the late Edo period. While it is usually applied to the anti-shogunate, pro-sonnō jōi (尊皇攘夷; "Revere the Emperor, Expel the Barbarian[s]") samurai primarily from the southwestern clans of Satsuma, Chōshū, and Tosa, the term shishi is also used by some with reference to supporters of the shogunate, such as the Shinsengumi.

There were many different varieties of shishi. Some, such as the assassins Kawakami Gensai, Nakamura Hanjirō, Okada Izō, and Tanaka Shinbei, opted for a more violent approach in asserting their views. Kawakami Gensai, in particular, is recalled as the assassin of Sakuma Shōzan, a renowned pro-Western thinker of the time. Several assaults on westerners in Japan have been attributed to the shishi and associated rōnin warriors. In a 2013 article, these assassins have been called "early terrorists" since they opted to spread terror among the foreigners. Other more radical shishi, such as Miyabe Teizō, plotted large-scale attacks with little regard for public safety. Miyabe himself was one of the ringleaders of the plot, foiled by the Shinsengumi at the Ikedaya Incident, to burn Kyoto at the height of the Gion Festival.

As mentioned above, shishi were not necessarily in support of bringing down the shogunate. Shishi from Mito were responsible for the death of the shogunal grand councilor Ii Naosuke, who was a signatory to treaties that favored foreign nations, and who had placed an underaged boy on the shogunal throne. Other Mito men and women arose in the Tengutō Rebellion, over the next several years. While these were definitely actions against the shōgun's government, they did not oppose the shōgun himself—indeed, the Mito shishi, who were retainers of a relative of the shōgun, believed they were only helping him.

Other shishi had more scholastic leanings. A prime example of this was the scholar Yoshida Shōin of Chōshū. He founded the Shokason-juku school, and educated many of the future government leaders of Meiji era Japan. Yoshida had connections to many prominent figures of the Bakumatsu era: Kawai Tsugunosuke, Katsu Kaishū, the aforementioned Sakuma Shōzan, and others.

The more radical shishi from Chōshū and Satsuma went on to form the core leadership of the nascent Meiji Government. Some, such as Itō Hirobumi and Yamagata Aritomo, remained prominent figures in Japanese politics and society until the early decades of the 20th century.

See also

 Shinsengumi

References
Notes

Works cited
 

Political organizations based in Japan
Meiji Restoration